The Arkansas Mountain AVA is an American Viticultural Area located in the Ozark Mountains of northwestern Arkansas.  It is part of the larger Ozark Mountain AVA, which also includes regions in Missouri and Oklahoma.  The smaller Altus AVA is entirely contained within the Arkansas Mountain AVA.  The Arkansas Mountain AVA includes , making it the ninth largest AVA as of 2008.

References

External links 
  TTB AVA Map

American Viticultural Areas
Arkansas wine
1986 establishments in Arkansas